Royal Wings (RW) was an airline based in Amman, Jordan. It was a Royal Jordanian Group Company and the charter arm of Royal Jordanian. Its main base was at Queen Alia International Airport (AMM), Amman with hubs also at Amman Civil Airport (ADJ) and King Hussein International Airport (AQJ).

History
The scheduled service strategy of Royal Wings was initiated to develop a domestic and regional carrier for Jordan which could adequately serve the needs of domestic travel, national and regional tours. During the introduction of Royal Wings, the fleet consisted  of two Bombardier DHC-8 which operated scheduled flights from Amman Civil Airport in Jordan from Amman to Aqaba, Tel Aviv, Gaza, Arish, Ankara, Aleppo, Sharm el-Sheikh and Alexandria. In addition to charter services to a number of destinations namely Larnaca, Rhodes, Antalya, Dalaman, Bodrum, Hurghada, Sharm el-Sheikh, Alexandria, Luxor and Aswan, mainly during the summer holiday season (June to October) and on occasions of festivals like Eid, Easter, Christmas and New Year.

In addition to air transport, Royal Wings provides handling and maintenance services to other aircraft. In 1979, the Fixed-base operator (FBO) was established at Amman Civil Airport by providing VIP handling to all general aviation aircraft as well as for commercial flights.                   

On November 13, 2018, the parent company of the airline Royal Jordanian, announced that all Royal Wings operations would end on November 30, 2018, due to subsequent losses and high operating costs. It was also announced that the sole Royal Wings operated aircraft would be transferred back to Royal Jordanian. In addition, 12 seconded employees returned to Royal Jordanian and 18 new employees who previously were employed by Royal Wings also made the transfer to the parent company at the end of the month.

Destinations
Royal Wings operated scheduled flights to the following destinations as of April 2017:

Fleet
As of August 2017, Royal Wings operates one Airbus A320-200 leased from Royal Jordanian Airlines.

References

External links

Official website 

Defunct airlines of Jordan
Airlines established in 1996
Airlines disestablished in 2018
2018 disestablishments in Jordan
Jordanian companies established in 1996